Metal Slug 2nd Mission was released in 2000 in both Japan and North America by SNK for the Neo Geo Pocket Color The game was developed by Ukiyotei.

Gameplay
Gameplay is similar to the rest of the Metal Slug series in gameplay, but with noted improvements in graphics and controls from the original Neo Geo Pocket Color game, Metal Slug 1st Mission. Clearing all the missions of the game will unlock Tequila, a rebel soldier who has the ability to use the function of level selecting.

Reception 
In 2023, Time Extension identified Metal Slug 2nd Mission as one of the best games for the NGPC.

References

External links

2000 video games
Metal Slug
Neo Geo Pocket Color games
SNK games
Ukiyotei games
Video games featuring female protagonists
Video games scored by Yasuaki Fujita
Video games developed in Japan